Mimillaena is a genus of beetles in the family Cerambycidae, containing the following species:

 Mimillaena rufescens Breuning, 1958
 Mimillaena semiobscura Hayashi, 1961

References

Acanthocinini